Kaykhosrow Khan Cherkes was an Iranian gholam of Circassian origin, who served as beglerbeg (governor) of the Erivan Province (also known as Chokhur-e Sa'd) from 1648 to 1653 during the reign of Shah Abbas II (1642-1666).

References

Safavid ghilman
17th-century deaths
Safavid governors of Erivan
Iranian people of Circassian descent
17th-century people of Safavid Iran